River Road is a census-designated place (CDP) in Clallam County, Washington, United States. The population was 454 at the 2010 census. It is a primarily residential area next to the city of Sequim.

Geography
River Road is located southwest of Sequim at  (48.070477, -123.126889). The Sequim city limits border the River Road community to the north, east, and south. U.S. Route 101, a two-lane freeway at this point, passes just north of the CDP, leading west into Carlsborg.

The CDP lost approximately half of its area to the city of Sequim between 2000 and 2010.

Demographics
As of the census of 2000, there were 450 people, 178 households, and 134 families residing in the CDP. The population density was 724.0 people per square mile (280.2/km2). There were 192 housing units at an average density of 308.9/sq mi (119.6/km2). The racial makeup of the CDP was 90.22% White, 0.44% African American, 2.00% Native American, 3.78% Asian, 0.89% from other races, and 2.67% from two or more races. Hispanic or Latino of any race were 3.11% of the population.

There were 178 households, out of which 30.3% had children under the age of 18 living with them, 65.2% were married couples living together, 8.4% had a female householder with no husband present, and 24.7% were non-families. 19.7% of all households were made up of individuals, and 9.6% had someone living alone who was 65 years of age or older. The average household size was 2.53 and the average family size was 2.90.

In the CDP, the age distribution of the population shows 22.9% under the age of 18, 6.7% from 18 to 24, 21.6% from 25 to 44, 24.0% from 45 to 64, and 24.9% who were 65 years of age or older. The median age was 44 years. For every 100 females, there were 89.1 males. For every 100 females age 18 and over, there were 93.9 males.

The median income for a household in the CDP was $35,893, and the median income for a family was $46,875. Males had a median income of $36,071 versus $15,500 for females. The per capita income for the CDP was $18,142. None of the families and 3.4% of the population were living below the poverty line, including no under eighteens and 5.6% of those over 64.

References

Census-designated places in Clallam County, Washington
Census-designated places in Washington (state)